In the context of Lagrangian mechanics, the fiber derivative is used to convert between the Lagrangian and Hamiltonian forms.  In particular, if  is the configuration manifold then the Lagrangian  is defined on the tangent bundle  and the Hamiltonian is defined on the cotangent bundle —the fiber derivative is a map  such that

,

When restricted to a particular point, the fiber derivative is a Legendre transformation.

References 
 Marsden, Jerrod E.; Ratiu, Tudor (1998). Introduction to Mechanics and Symmetry: A Basic Exposition of Classical Mechanical Systems

Lagrangian mechanics